The women's doubles competition at the 2023 FIL European Luge Championships was held on 14 January 2023.

Results
The first run was held at 10:44 and the second run at 12:15.

References

Women's doubles